The 2020 Chicago Huntsmen was the first season for NRG Esports in the Call of Duty League.

Overview 
On October 24, 2019, the 5 man starting roster was announced, including the stars of the former OpTic roster, Seth "Scump" Abner and Matthew "FormaL" Piper. They were joined by recent World Champion Alec "Arcitys" Sanderson. Dylan "Envoy" Hannon and Pierce "Gunless" Hillman rounded off the 5-man starting roster. Marcus "MBoZe" Blanks and Jordon "General" General were named as substitutes with Troy "Sender" Michaels being named Head Coach.

The team was supposed to host their first Home Series of the 2020 CDL season on April 4 at Wintrust Arena, but due to the COVID-19 pandemic the event along with the league was moved online. The Huntsmen ended up coming in 3rd-4th, as the Dallas Empire won the Home Series.

In the inaugural CDL season, the Huntsmen finished the regular season with a record of 24-11 and placed 3rd at CoD Champs. The Huntsmen won the London Home Series after defeating the Dallas Empire 3–0. The Huntsmen also won the Seattle Home Series, their first event with Preston "Prestinni" Sanderson (the twin brother of Arcitys) after Gunless was dropped to the substitutes.

Final roster

Standings

Matches

References

2020 Call of Duty League seasons by team